Open and affirming (ONA) is an official designation of congregations and other settings in the United Church of Christ (UCC) affirming the full inclusion of gay, lesbian, bisexual, transgender and non-binary persons (LGBTQ) in the church's life and ministry. 

The Open and Affirming program is administered by the UCC Open and Affirming Coalition, which supports congregations and other church settings as they consider the adoption of an ONA "covenant" and maintains the official registry of ONA congregations and ministries. The Coalition encourages UCC congregations, campus ministries, seminaries, regional bodies and other settings of the church to engage their members in serious study of sexual orientation and gender identity and to declare publicly their full welcome and inclusion of LGBTQ people. With more than 1,600 congregations, the UCC's ONA program is the largest of several LGBT-welcoming church movements in U.S. and Canadian churches.

There is a similar "Open & Affirming" program in the Christian Church (Disciples of Christ).

History
In 1985 the United Church of Christ's General Synod adopted a resolution encouraging UCC congregations to welcome (or consider welcoming) gay, lesbian, and bisexual people after a time of dialogue, study and prayer. Following later General Synod resolutions affirming transgender members of the church, the welcome was extended so that, today, an ONA covenant typically welcomes members of any sexual orientation or gender identity and expression. An ONA church is expected to commit to the inclusion of LGBTQ members in the sacraments and ministries of the church, including marriage.

The 1985 resolution had no legislative authority over individual congregations, which are autonomous, but set in motion a movement that spread rapidly throughout the church.

The resolution allocated no funds to support an ONA program in the UCC's national office. As a result, the UCC Coalition for LGBT Concerns launched an ONA program in 1987, led by the Rev. Ann B. Day and Donna Enberg, which raised funds from individual contributors, sympathetic congregations and private foundations. To this day, the official registry of ONA congregations is managed by the Coalition (since renamed the Open and Affirming Coalition), a voluntary non-profit organization independent from the church's national office, although it works in close partnership with the UCC's national ministries. The Coalition publishes a wide range of resources to support congregations considering an ONA commitment and to help existing ONA churches build relationships with the LGBTQ community.

New York City's Riverside Church, under the pastoral leadership of the late Rev. William Sloane Coffin, was the first in the UCC to be listed as Open and Affirming in 1987.

According to the Coalition, more than 1,600 UCC congregations with 370,000 members (about 33 percent of all UCC churches) are listed as officially Open and Affirming as of December 2019. Twenty-one of the UCC's 38 regional conferences, most new church starts, all seven seminaries affiliated with the UCC and several UCC-related campus ministries have adopted ONA statements, or "covenants." Other ministries in the UCC, like the Council for Health and Human Service Ministries and the Order of Corpus Christi have also adopted ONA covenants.

Opposition
In response to the perceived promotion of the ONA movement by denominational officials, 75 UCC congregations have identified themselves as "Faithful and Welcoming" by affirming the Lexington Confession (named for the North Carolina town where it was drafted), which affirms marriage as an relationship between a man and woman.

See also

 LGBT-affirming religious groups

Notes

External links
UCC Open and Affirming Coalition website
UCC LGBT Ministries
Open & Affirming website for Christian Church (Disciples of Christ)

United Church of Christ
LGBT Christian organizations